Edward Einhorn (born September 6, 1970) is an American playwright, theater director, and novelist, noted for the comic absurdism of his drama and the imaginative richness of his literary works.

A native of Westfield, New Jersey, Einhorn graduated from Westfield High School, where he was an editor of the student newspaper Hi's Eye. He attended Johns Hopkins University. In 1992 he started the Untitled Theater Company #61 in New York (co-founded with his older brother David Einhorn, who has produced plays for the company). With that company, Edward Einhorn directed T. S. Eliot's Sweeney Agonistes, Eugène Ionesco's The Bald Soprano, Dennis Potter's Brimstone and Treacle, and Richard Foreman's My Head Was a Sledgehammer, among other works. He staged a festival of the complete plays of Eugène Ionesco, a celebration of the total plays of Václav Havel, a calypso musical adaptation of Kurt Vonnegut's Cat's Cradle, an adaptation of Do Androids Dream of Electric Sheep, and a "Neurofest" of plays on aspects of neurology. Off-Broadway, he directed Fairy Tales of the Absurd, a trilogy of one-act plays, two by Ionesco and one (One Head Too Many) by himself. Other adaptations include The Lathe of Heaven, by Ursula Le Guin and City of Glass, by Paul Auster.

As playwright, Einhorn composed one-act and full-length plays, becoming known for his absurd comic style. One of his best-known plays, if not his best-known, is The Marriage of Alice B. Toklas by Gertrude Stein, a farce set at a fantasy marriage between Stein and Toklas. The show received a Critic's Pick from Jesse Green, then co-chief reviewer of The New York Times. Another recent work is Alma Baya, a dystopian absurdist science fiction play. Other works include dramas on Jewish legends and a series of plays on neurological and neuroscientific topics — The Neurology of the Soul (on neuromarketing), The Boy Who Wanted to be a Robot (on Asperger syndrome), The Taste of Blue, (on synesthesia), Strangers (on Korsakoff syndrome), and Linguish (on aphasia). He adapted Lysistrata and Iphigenia in Aulis for modern audiences. He has also written a few plays on Czech subjects, such as Rudolf II (based on the 16th century Emperor who lived in Prague), and The Velvet Oratorio (a Vaněk play staged at Lincoln Center and based on the events of the Velvet Revolution). His most personal play, Drs. Jane and Alexander, is a found text piece about his mother and his grandfather, Alexander Wiener, who discovered the Rh factor in blood.

Einhorn has also written two Oz novels, Paradox in Oz and The Living House of Oz (both illustrated by Eric Shanower), as well as a number of short stories. His considerable output also includes two picture books on mathematical subjects for young readers: A Very Improbable Story, on the subject of probability, and Fractions in Disguise, on the subject of fractions. A number of his plays have also been published, including his Hanukkah drama, Playing Dreidel with Judah Maccabee

In 2011, he authored the first English language translation of Václav Havel's final play, The Pig, or Václav Havel's Hunt for a Pig, as well as Havel's one-act, Ela, Hela, and the Hitch. Both were published, as part of Theatre 61 Press' Havel Collection. Einhorn also wrote the introductions to all the books in the Havel Collection.

In 2014 and 2015, he created and produced the show Money Lab, an economic vaudeville, produced at HERE Arts Center in Manhattan and The Brick in Brooklyn.

In 2020, his podcast The Resistible Rise of J. R. Brinkley was released, a four-part audio drama about the quack doctor turned politician, hosted by Dan Butler.

In 2021, his podcast The Iron Heel was released, a three-part audio drama adaptation of the book by Jack London.

In 2022, he directed a film of The Last Cyclist written in Terezin by Karel Svenk and reconstructed by Naomi Patz, which was originally staged at La MaMa Experimental Theatre Club and broadcast on WNET Channel 13, a PBS affiliate, as part of Theater Close Up.

References

External links
 Edward Einhorn's website
 Untitled Theater Company #61
 Bio on Theater 61 Press website
 

20th-century American novelists
1970 births
Living people
Jewish American novelists
People from Westfield, New Jersey
Jewish American dramatists and playwrights
Novelists from New Jersey
Translators to English
Translators from Czech
21st-century American novelists
Jewish dramatists and playwrights
20th-century American dramatists and playwrights
20th-century translators
21st-century translators
American male novelists
American male dramatists and playwrights
20th-century American male writers
21st-century American male writers
Westfield High School (New Jersey) alumni
21st-century American Jews